Finn Sterobo (17 December 1933 – 25 February 2021) was a Danish footballer. He played in two matches for the Denmark national football team in 1962. He was also part of Denmark's squad at the 1960 Summer Olympics, but he did not play in any matches.

References

External links
 

1933 births
2021 deaths
Danish men's footballers
Denmark international footballers
Footballers from Odense
Association football goalkeepers
Odense Boldklub players
Boldklubben 1909 players